Llusk'a (Quechua for polished, slippery, also spelled Lluskha) is a  mountain in the Bolivian Andes. It is located in the Chuquisaca Department, Azurduy Province, Tarvita Municipality.

References 

Mountains of Chuquisaca Department